Khanpur is a town in the Mahisagar district, Gujarat, India.

Geography
This is located near Lunavada and is 10km from Kadana Dam. Major business point of their area around villages.

Koli rebellion 

In 1857, British Government stationed his army in Lunavada State under Captain Calling to control this area because of Indian Rebellion of 1857. Kolis of Khanpur in Lunavada raised against British Raj under their Koli chief Jivabhai Thakor. The british government sent his army under Captain Buckle and attacked and burnt the Khanpur village. Jivabhai Thakor was first ruler in his area who assumed the leadership of revolt. After that Jivabhai Thakor again collected an army of kolis but british subsequently sent his army from Baroda State and put down the koli rebellion and Jivabhai Thakor was hanged.

References

Cities and towns in Mahisagar district
Villages in Khanpur Taluka